Mokete Mokhosi (born 7 May 1969) is a Lesotho taekwondo practitioner. He competed in the men's 80 kg category during the 2000 Summer Olympics. He also competed in the 1997 and 1999 World Taekwondo Championships.

References

Living people
1969 births
Lesotho taekwondo practitioners
Olympic taekwondo practitioners of Lesotho
Taekwondo practitioners at the 2000 Summer Olympics
African Taekwondo Championships medalists